A literary award or literary prize is an award presented in recognition of a particularly lauded literary piece or body of work. It is normally presented to an author. This is a list of notable literary awards awarded in South Africa.

Alphabetically

A 

 Adelaide Tambo Award for Human Rights in the Arts
 Alba Bouwer Prize
 Amstel Playwright of the Year Award
 ATKV Prose Prize

C 

 C.P. Hoogenhout Award
 Central News Agency Literary Award

D 

 David Higham Prize for Fiction
 Dinaane Debut Fiction Award

E 

 Eugène Marais Prize
 Exclusive Books Boeke Prize

F 

 Percy FitzPatrick Award

H 

 Hertzog Prize

I 

 Ingrid Jonker Prize

M 

 M-Net Literary Awards
 Maskew Miller Longman Literature Awards
 Mbokodo Award
 Media24 Books Literary Awards

O 

 Olive Schreiner Prize

S 

 Sol Plaatje Prize for Translation
 South African Literary Awards
 Sunday Times CNA Literary Awards – a suite of prizes given annually by wRite associates and the South African Dept of Arts and Culture

T 

 The Cape Tercentenary Foundation
 Thomas Pringle Award

U 

 University of Johannesburg Prize

See also 

 List of literary awards#South African literature

 
South Africa